Ifor Evans may refer to:

 Ifor Evans, Baron Evans of Hungershall (1899–1982), British academic and university administrator; provost of University College London
 Ifor Leslie Evans (1897–1952), Welsh academic; principal of the University College of Wales Aberystwyth

See also
 Ivor Evans (disambiguation)